Get Happy!! is the fourth studio album by English singer-songwriter Elvis Costello, and his third with the Attractions—keyboardist Steve Nieve, bassist Bruce Thomas and drummer Pete Thomas (no relation). It was released on 15February 1980 through F-Beat Records in the United Kingdom and Columbia Records in the United States. Produced by Nick Lowe and engineered by Roger Béchirian, the sessions began in London but moved to the Netherlands after Costello found the material derivative of his previous album Armed Forces (1979). The sessions were problematic but amassed a large number of songs; the final album contains 20 tracks across a single LP.

A departure from Costello's prior works, Get Happy!! is influenced by R&B, ska and soul music of the 1960s. Two cover songs, Sam & Dave's "I Can't Stand Up for Falling Down" and the Merseybeats' "I Stand Accused", are included. In contrast to the upbeat music, the mostly downbeat lyrics cover recurring themes such as doomed romances. Initial album sleeves reversed the side labels, which was corrected for later reissues. The cover art reflects the soul influence and was designed to resemble a 1960s Stax record, with initial copies boasting a pre-worn sleeve.

Initially delayed due to a dispute with Warner Bros. and Costello's former label Radar, Get Happy!! charted at number two in the UK and number 11 in the US, but sold less than Armed Forces. It was supported by a UK tour and three singles, of which "I Can't Stand Up for Falling Down" reached the UK top five. The album received positive reviews from music critics. Many focused on the quantity of tracks, which they felt varied in quality, although others gave high praise to the record and Costello himself. It is retrospectively viewed as one of his best works. Appearing on lists of the best albums of the 1980s, it has been reissued multiple times with bonus tracks.

Background

Elvis Costello and the Attractions—bassist Bruce Thomas, drummer Pete Thomas (no relation) and keyboardist Steve Nieve—supported his third studio album Armed Forces on the Armed Funk tour in America, which lasted from February to April 1979. The tour was plagued with issues, including drug and alcohol problems, aggressive behaviour from Costello and his manager Jake Riviera to the press, and poor performances that led to critical and audience backlash. In March, Costello engaged in a drunken exchange with Stephen Stills, where he insulted various American musical artists, including James Brown and Ray Charles, using racial slurs. Although Costello quickly apologised in a press conference, details of the exchange was leaked to the public and he received additional backlash; he received death threats and Armed Forces was pulled from radio stations. By the tour's end, Costello's reputation in America was nearly destroyed. Bruce Thomas later admitted: "We never really recovered from that tour. Every time Elvis is doing something well, he kind of sabotages it." His reputation in the United Kingdom, however, remained largely unaffected, mostly due to newspapers failing to pick up the story. Author Mick St. Michael compares it to the worldwide response from John Lennon's 1966 more popular than Jesus comment.

Costello first acknowledged the incident in an interview with Rolling Stone in 1982, feeling that it "outweighs my entire career", but later reflected in his 2015 memoir Unfaithful Music & Disappearing Ink: "So what if my career was rolled back off the launching pad? Life eventually became a lot more interesting due to this failure to get into some undeserved and potentially fatal orbit." Although he remained with Columbia Records, he did not tour America again until 1981 in support of Trust. Following the disastrous tour, he decided to reevaluate himself and his career. He ended his relationship with Bebe Buell and reconciled with his wife Mary and son Matthew. Apart from the occasional demo and promotional gig, he and the Attractions took some time off from each other over the summer of 1979; the former produced the Specials' debut album in June while the latter recorded an album released in September as Mad About the Wrong Boy. During his time working with the Specials, Costello taped demos at Archipelago, a small eight-track studio in Pimlico, London, and played all instruments himself, yielding versions of "Black and White World", "Riot Act", "Five Gears in Reverse", "Love for Tender", "King Horse", "New Amsterdam" and "Men Called Uncle". According to his biographer Graeme Thomson, Costello had grown to hate the sound of Armed Forces and aimed to take a different direction for his next album.

Recording

Costello and the Attractions regrouped at London's Eden Studios in September and October 1979 to rehearse the new tracks but, having written and performed the material during the Armed Funk Tour in a style similar to Armed Forces, Costello was displeased with the results, finding them derivative and too "new wave". Bruce Thomas recalled: "We sounded like the Jags. Bad Elvis and the Attractions impersonators, basically, who played everything fast and in eights." Thomson states that the band's classic sound was now outdated and the initial attempt at "B Movie" sounded like "a desperate attempt" at rewriting "Oliver's Army" (1979). Wanting a new direction, Costello immersed himself in soul music he enjoyed as a teenager and purchased several soul records at London's Camden Town, such as Motown Chartbusters Vol. 3 and Atlantic Records' This Is Soul, which he gave to the band as inspiration. They then went back and re-arranged many of the songs using an R&B sound. The band also grew tired of Eden and relocated to Wisseloord Studios in Hilversum, Netherlands. Returning as producer and engineer were Nick Lowe and Roger Béchirian, respectively.

Recording took place throughout October 1979. Despite the change in scenery, the sessions were enveloped with problems. The band drank frequently, while Béchirian recalled it being a "cocaine haze". Having played the majority of tracks live before going into the studio on previous albums, the new songs were being rearranged frequently and boasted little time to pause. For the Attractions, Nieve suffered an emotional meltdown while Bruce and Pete Thomas were unhappy with their bass and drum sounds, respectively. Béchirian later stated: "It wasn't pleasant at all. You could see the seams coming apart at that point." In addition, Lowe found issues with the studio, even having Costello record his vocals in the booth designed for string instruments: "[It] was extremely Euro. It was like trying to make a record as the Eurovision song contest was going on all around you." Thomson finds that due to the tense recording sessions, the album's title "seemed more a desperate hope than a playful instruction".

The band amassed a large amount of songs during the sessions, with 20 filling the original album; almost all are under two-and-a-half minutes in length. According to Costello, the vinyl cutting and pressing process had to be precise to fit all of them on the two sides of the LP. Two cover versions made the final tracklist: the Sam & Dave B-side "I Can't Stand Up for Falling Down" and the Merseybeats' "I Stand Accused". Although covers had appeared in Costello's live sets and as B-sides, Get Happy!! marked the first appearance of a non-original on one of his UK studio albums. The Archipelago recording of "New Amsterdam" was kept for the final album, as Costello felt it could not be improved upon. Outtakes that appeared as B-sides included "Girls Talk", a second version of "Clowntime Is Over" and a cover of Betty Everett's "Getting Mighty Crowded".

Music and lyrics

Musically, Get Happy!! represents a departure from Costello's previous records, taking influences from the R&B and soul sound of the 1960s, as well as ska. Michael Gallucci of Ultimate Classic Rock described it as "a throwback to '60s R&B music played with new wave bite". In his book Let Them All Talk: The Music of Elvis Costello, biographer Brian Hinton states that with Get Happy!!, the artist invested in "soul sources with an introspection and bitterness previously alien to the genre". However, not all the tracks took direct influence from R&B and soul. Costello stated that "Human Touch" was influenced by his recent work producing the Specials, while "Men Called Uncle" and "Beaten to the Punch" were influenced by the 1960s Liverpool sound that drew the same styles as the Merseybeats' "I Stand Accused". Some commentators saw the songs on Get Happy!! as a response to the events of the Armed Funk tour, although in the 2003 reissue liner notes for the album, Costello stated that "Riot Act" was the only track on the album to refer to the incident, further commenting:

The album's title is taken from the song of the same name, written by Harold Arlen and Ted Koehler. Biographer Tony Clayton-Lea finds it an ironic comment on the LP's lyrical content, which is "steeped in discontent". Indeed, the upbeat songs provide a stark contrast to the downbeat lyrics, particularly on "King Horse". Reviewing the album on release, critic Robert Hilburn of the Los Angeles Times found that the song titles hint at the "jarring encounters" described throughout, naming "Beaten to the Punch", "Temptation", "Possession", "Clowntime Is Over" and "High Fidelity". Biographer David Gouldstone splits the songs into public ones – songs concerned with public issues ("Opportunity", "Clowntime Is Over", "5ive Gears in Reverse" and "Temptation") and personal ones – songs detailing personal conflicts (all other tracks). He further notes that almost all the songs have narrators, with "King Horse" highlighting that they all have human failings. A theme of doomed romance, inspired by the artist's former relationship with Buell, appears in tracks such as "Beaten to the Punch", "Riot Act", "Men Called Uncle", "New Amsterdam" and "B Movie". Additionally, The Ringer Elizabeth Nelson retrospectively found that Costello intended "Temptation", "Opportunity" and "Possession" to be "a kind of Burroughs-like, cut-up trilogy", dissecting them as "a tortured romance in three acts" or "a plan for military domination".

The original album sleeve labels for Get Happy!! were reversed; side one began with "I Can't Stand Up for Falling Down" and ended with "Riot Act", while side two started with "Love for Tender" and ended with "High Fidelity", which was corrected for later reissues. Author James E. Perone argues that the swapping is significant, as the album makes "more rhetorical sense" with "Love for Tender" as the opener and "Riot Act" as the closer.

Side one
Opening track "Love for Tender", a deliberate misquote of "Love Me Tender" by Elvis Presley, is an upbeat R&B track that immediately demonstrates the soul influence with a James Jamerson-style bass and Motown-era handclaps and percussion. The rushed song uses thematic punning to reference both affection and monetary advances. A reworking of the Armed Forces outtake "Clean Money", Costello stated that he used the same "You Can't Hurry Love" riff that the Jam used for "Town Called Malice" that was a UK number one in 1982. Nelson found the opening lines ("You won't take my love for tender?") set a precedent for the entire album, in which "one clever but fractious phrase after another unspools as though autogenerated from a demented mail-order catalog". "Opportunity" is the first of several cryptic songs on the album. The partly autobiographical number contains numerous references to being watched or under surveillance, which the narrator is powerless to do anything about except wait for opportunities to come. In his 1989 book Elvis Costello: God's Comic, Gouldstone gives an interpretation of the song as "a dissident aside on the values and organisation of post-war Britain". Perone highlights the track as showcasing Costello's skills as a guitar player.

Employing a punk-ska groove, "The Imposter" is the narrator's attack on a man who has won the affection over a woman he is also in love with; to the narrator, he is an 'imposter' and is surprised no one else sees it. AllMusic's Stewart Mason argued the track is Nieve's finest performance on record. "Secondary Modern" employs a slower soul groove with downbeat lyrics that Gouldstone finds "enigmatic". Like other tracks, the narrator pleas for a woman to accept him. Interpreting the phrase "secondary modern"–former schools for children that failed grammar school–Gouldstone finds that the phrase might have appealed to Costello due to its "secondary importance" in modern times, which is the final fate of most of his songs' characters.

Like "The Imposter", "King Horse" is aimed at tough guys who harass waitresses and stewardesses. Gouldstone comments that "to call someone 'king horse' is in effect to accuse them of being driven by ruthless selfishness, of trampling over other people to reach their desires". Musically, the song uses the guitar figure from the Four Tops' "Reach Out I'll Be There" (1966). AllMusic's Rick Anderson argued that it anticipated the sound Costello would explore on Trust the following year. "Possession" was written in Holland during a five-minute taxi ride heading back to the studio from a local café. The opening lines and basic quotes are taken from the Beatles' "From Me to You" (1963) and took inspiration from, in Costello's words, the "grand marching style" of Bob Dylan's "Is Your Love in Vain?" (1978). Reassuring a recurring theme of finance and business throughout Get Happy!!, the song concerns a failed relationship and implies that money be provided rather than love itself. The narrator in "Men Called Uncle" shows distaste for a woman and her older man, whom she calls "uncle". Like other tracks, he displays indifference towards her but deep down desires her love and affection. Perone finds the music similar to the pop styles of the 1960s British Invasion.

The lyrics of "Clowntime Is Over" are vague, but Gouldstone argues that it concerns "some kind of lament". He continues that words and phrases such as "blackmail", "ransom", "somebody's watching" and "a voice in the shadows" offer sinister undertones that indicate an unexpected evil is growing upon us. Reviewer Dave McCullough opined that the song has that "familiar feeling of aggressive assurity, relayed in a sudden jerk at the end of every verse". Musically, Nelson compares the song to "circus music from the Weimar Republic" that is set against a "mechanized march" she likens to Kraftwerk and David Bowie's Berlin period. On the other hand, "New Amsterdam" stands apart from the rest of the album in that is a folk-like acoustic number, having been recorded entirely by Costello himself as a demo. A waltz, the nostalgic lyrics are about arriving in the New World and describe life there as being "almost like suicide". Hinton finds that it is the only song that comes from a non-persona. "High Fidelity" marks a return to the soul influences, with a sound echoing the Supremes; its opening line also quotes a song title by them. The lyrics are addressed to an ex-partner who now has found a new lover and contain Costello's signature wordplay to reference radios and record players.

Side two

Opening side two is the cover of "I Can't Stand Up for Falling Down", a soul track that describes a hurtful love affair. Gouldstone argues that its presence adds "authentic sixties atmosphere" to the LP. On the other hand, the title of "Black and White World" recalls the early days of cinema and the simpler days of childhood. Like "New Amsterdam", the theme of the song is nostalgia, reflecting on days of innocence gone by, and also combines ideals of time, the media and battles between the sexes set against, in Gouldstone's words, "powerful and gripping music". "5ive Gears in Reverse" implies that society is digressing rather than progressing, with the chorus concerning hopelessness and futility. Driven by a guitar riff and a bassline, it is sung "lustfully" rather than "lustily". Hinton finds the track also acts as a "raison d'etre" for the album, or "backwards into the future".

Both "B Movie" and "Motel Matches" contain wordplay that references Costello's life while on the road for three years, similar to the lyrics on Armed Forces. Described by McCullough as "a quivering skeleton of a song", the former is addressed to a woman, seemingly putting her down and casually references violence towards her. The latter, while not as brutal, describes an unsatisfactory affair taking place in a motel room; Hinton states that "emotion overtakes cleverness". Returning to ska rhythms is the ambivalent "Human Touch", in which the narrator is digusted by his partner and the world, begins drinking heavily and physically assaulting her, yet he longs for the "human touch" from her. Gouldstone finds that the music mimics the disintegration of his mind. Hinton likens the track to This Year's Model "Lip Service" (1978) or, in theory, Costello's take on the Beatles' "Ob-La-Di, Ob-La-Da" (1968). Hinton also draws Beatles comparisons for "Beaten to the Punch", which contains the same bassline as "Taxman" (1966). The energetic rock song "Beaten to the Punch" is an attack on a man and his "juvenile macho attitudes".

Costello based "Temptation" on Booker T. & the M.G.'s' "Time Is Tight" (1969), a song which concerns alcoholism and defenselessness. Similar to other tracks on the album, "Temptation" is addressed to a man and is presumed by Gouldstone to concern the troubles of living in a competitive and bureaucratic society. Regarding the cover of "I Stand Accused", the author argues that it could pass as one of Costello's originals due to the performances and use of thematic punning. The final track, "Riot Act", reflects on a past relationship with "abject desolation" rather than disdain. Costello gives a tender vocal performance that displays emotion and builds into a near-scream by the end. Hinton calls it the "first genuinely relaxed song on the whole LP". With an arrangement Mason considered "almost bombastic", Hinton compares the music to the English band Procol Harum.

Packaging and artwork
According to Hinton, the cover artwork for Get Happy!! was designed to resemble a Stax record from the 1960s. Designed by Barney Bubbles, and featuring a clash of changing colours, the geometric sleeve contains three identical images of Costello photographed from above, with his hands in the pockets of a buttoned-up coat and his face appearing "almost deformed". The UK release featured a pre-worn sleeve: the front came with a fake coffee mug stain while the back featured a large circle, giving the effect that the vinyl itself was worn through the packaging; the effect was omitted from other editions. Original copies also lacked a lyric sheet.

Release and promotion
Originally intended for release in early January 1980, Get Happy!! was delayed due to legal issues. In December 1979, Radar Records founder Andrew Lauder and Riviera left the label and formed a new independent label, F-Beat Records. However, any UK signee to Radar's was also signed to the label's parent company, Warner Bros, and Warner disliked both Costello and Lowe leaving without recompense. The dispute eventually went to court. Costello attempted to release the first chosen single, "I Can't Stand Up for Falling Down", on the Specials' label 2 Tone Records, but Warner blocked its release due to the ongoing legal proceedings. Once resolved, the song, backed by "Girls Talk", was rush-released as the first single on 8February and reached number four on the UK Singles Chart in early March. Get Happy!! followed it in the UK a week later on 15February 1980, over a year after its predecessor, released with the catalogue number XXLP 1. In the US, it was issued through Columbia the week of 25February.

Throughout March 1980, Costello and the Attractions toured the UK for the first time in almost a year, playing in smaller venues in lesser-known cities compared to previous live outings. Drawing on material from his four albums up to that point—primarily Get Happy!! and This Year's Model—and covering various soul tunes to reflect Costello's renewed appreciation, the shows were greeted positively. Supporting act Clive Langer praised the Attractions: "I was amazed by them live. The power. They would just come out of the dressing room and attack." However, due to his alcohol and drug abuse, Costello himself suffered several moments of instability during the shows, including forgetting lyrics, freezing in place and poor vocals. It culminated on 1April, when he decided he had enough and fully quit music. "High Fidelity" was issued on 12" vinyl as the second single from Get Happy!! three days later and reached the UK top 30. The retirement did not last long, as the band were back on the road throughout Europe in mid-April, although a car accident resulted in Nieve being temporarily replaced by the Rumour's guitarist Martin Belmont. Nieve's absence led to poor shows, while the setlists were amended and featured almost no tracks from Get Happy!!, save for recent single "High Fidelity". In June, "New Amsterdam" was released as an EP of the same name with bonus tracks Costello had recorded at Fulham's T.W. and Ampro Studios, including "Just a Memory", "Ghost Train" and "Dr. Luther's Assistant". "New Amsterdam" was also issued a single, backed by "Dr. Luther's Assistant", the same month.

Aided by rising expectations and coverage on soul stations, Get Happy!! reached number two on the UK Albums Chart and number 11 on the US Billboard Top LPs & Tape chart. However, it sold less copies than its predecessor Armed Forces and was thus viewed as a commercial disappointment. Béchirian recalled: "Jake [Riviera] actually laughed about having a Get Happy!! house in his garden made with all the unsold records." Thomson opines that the incident with Stills most likely played a role in its lesser performance in America, but also states that the label were unsure how to market the album there and radio stations disliked the change in musical direction and less pop-friendly tunes compared to Armed Forces. Costello also chose not to tour in America due to the incident, which further affected promotion. F-Beat Records was also struggling financially at the time. The promotional campaign included over 100,000 free posters, over 500 record store window displays, magazine adverts and radio and television ads, which proved fraught for the label. Lauder later admitted: "We had overpressed on the album based on the sales of Armed Forces, which was a platinum album. We had a situation where we were shipping out lots of records and they were all coming back. Having paid for all the advertising and all the publicity, financially it was a tough one to make."

Critical reception

While not receiving the acclaim of its three predecessors, Get Happy!! received generally positive reviews from music critics on release. Many commented on the amount of tracks present on the LP, finding they varied in quality. Ira Robbins of Trouser Press, in particular, found the 20 tracks range from "ace to awful" and with a condensed track listing, Get Happy!! would have been "incredible": "As it is, bad items detract from good ones. The album also suffers from a stupefying maze of verses, choruses and refrains." Continuing his mixed review, Robbins found the album lacked a coherent or pervasive theme, felt rushed and noted the stepped-down production from Armed Forces, concluding, "don't bother to get happy; I'm sure Costello wouldn't." The Washington Post Eve Zibart was also critical towards the production, stating: "Where Phil Spector painstakingly built a wall of sound, producer Nick Lowe has constructed a chain-link fence. It works to the advantage of several numbers, but Lowe overdoes it." Chris Brazier of Melody Maker also complained about "uneven" material and the 1960s-style production. Discussing the artist himself, Robert Christgau wrote that Get Happy! establishes "not his fecundity but his fallibility" in The Village Voice, noting the presence of "lotsa duds", but observed some memorable "tropes and hooks". Red Starr, writing in Smash Hits, remarked that it was "short on memorable songs" but that "repeated plays reveal hidden depths". Meanwhile, Rolling Stones Tom Carson felt that "if the new album is hard to get into, it's also difficult to ignore", concluding: "He's succeeded in making his obsessions belong to us. For better or worse, we'll all ride them out together to the end."

Nevertheless, many offered high praise towards Get Happy!!, with Creem Jeff Nesin proclaiming: "If you care about rock 'n' roll you must have this album." In The New York Times, Robert Palmer deemed Get Happy!! Costello's most satisfying work up that point, commenting on the "stylistic range, emotional depth, melodic richness and verbal invention" in the songs, where the "writing has never been stronger". Joel Selvin of the San Francisco Chronicle also placed it among the artist's best work, highlighting the "distinctive" songwriting and Lowe's production, which he felt created a "sense of being both precise and off-hand". Meanwhile, Sounds magazine's Dave McCullough was highly positive, writing that the album "soars to a pinnacle of Costello's combined creative force, by the end leaving the listener quite breathless." Paul Ramble was also positive in NME, drawing positive comparisons to Armed Forces and announcing: "It's a record you didn't expect. It looks like fun and it is. Maybe it's only a temporary lapse, but Elvis has gotten off the treadmill and gotten happy. Get it."

Other reviewers praised Costello himself as an artist. Billboard magazine found the artist "hasn't lost any of his stunt or verve on this snappy LP", which they predicted would be "a sure bet for AOR radio". Cash Box agreed, deducing: "What can you say about the new wave kingpin except that he gets better with age." The reviewer argued that the amount of tracks on the LP "should make any record buyer happy with the quality and quantity of the material", a sentiment echoed by Hilburn who, in the Los Angeles Times, selected Get Happy!! for the month's disc derby with the Clash's London Calling (1979). Commenting on the number of tracks, he argued that "by including 20 tunes in the LP, [Costello] demonstrated his disregard for critics and businessmen". Deeming Get Happy!! "a vibrant work by someone who both understands rock 'n' roll's history and aggressively seeks to shape its future", Hilburn felt it was not as "powerfully framed" as Armed Forces, but "still bristle[d] with the independence that has characterized the British rocker's brief but provocative career."

Get Happy!! placed at number two on lists of the best albums of 1980 by NME (behind Joy Division's Closer) and Trouser Press (behind the Clash's London Calling), while the album placed seventh on The Village Voices annual Pazz & Jop music critics' poll, beating out such better selling releases as Michael Jackson's Off the Wall, Stevie Wonder's Hotter than July and Pete Townshend's Empty Glass.

Legacy
Get Happy!! was a turning point in Costello's career, being the first step away from the angry persona that he had embodied up to that point. He began adding more of himself into the material, later stating: "There was really the need in me to reflect something else: a bit more tenderness, a bit more regret, because you make mistakes in your life and you have to sing about those as well as the things you're very confident or cocky about." Throughout mid-1980, Costello began writing new songs and revising older, unused ones that would reflect this new form of thinking, debuting a few during live performances during the summer. His next album, 1981's Trust, would be envisioned by the artist as combining the "melodic lushness" of Armed Forces and the "rhythmic drive" of Get Happy!!. Gouldstone further comments that the album marked the beginning of Costello's "most fruitful period" that yielded the "trilogy of magnificent albums": Get Happy!!, Trust and Imperial Bedroom (1982). In 2019, Squeeze guitarist Chris Difford named the album as an inspiration, stating, "Get Happy!! was a big album for me. I just loved the lyrics. I loved the performances on that record. It's brilliant." Costello would produce Squeeze's 1981 album East Side Story.

Retrospective appraisal

Retrospective reviews have been very positive, and Get Happy!! has since been considered one of Costello's best works. Writing in The New Rolling Stone Album Guide, critic Rob Sheffield dubbed it a "tour de force", a sentiment echoed by senior AllMusic editor Stephen Thomas Erlewine, who hailed Get Happy!! as more than a "genre exercise". Finding the inconsistent quality of its tracks part of its overall charm, he ended that the album "bursts with energy and invention, standing as a testament to how Costello, the pop encyclopedia, can reinvent the past in his own image". Meanwhile, Chris Jones of BBC Music declared it Costello's finest album and "the greatest coherent statement he ever created" in 2008.

In 2015, Gallucci wrote that the album contains some of the artist's best songs from the period. He continued that despite being dismissed as a novelty during discussions of Costello's works from the 1980s, Get Happy!! "may be his most jubilant LP ever", with all 20 tracks packing "more muscle, hooks, heart and, yes, soul than many of his more acclaimed records that followed." Discussing the album for its 40th anniversary, Nelson described the LP as "a bracing time capsule of a singer-songwriter at the height of his powers and coming apart under pressure", drawing comparisons to the Beatles' "White Album" (1968). She further labelled it "a landmark in maximalist efficiency" that anticipated works by the Minutemen, They Might Be Giants and Aesop Rock, ultimately appraising it as a successful comeback record: "a dizzying display of desperation and talent that remains a fascinating, frantic flare from a sinking ship."

Some commentators highlighted the performances of the Attractions. Deeming Get Happy!! an album of chemistry rather than "individual cameos", Thomson states that the record showed the backing band at "their rawest and roughest", with "little sophistication" from Armed Forces. Nelson agreed, finding their performances stand out with individual styles that become "almost automated", thereby "embroidering Costello's frenzied impulses into supple, insinuating grooves that can seem at times almost oblivious to the man raving over them". Perone notes that Pete Thomas's bass drum is higher in the mix, giving the tracks a "four-on-the-floor style" that differentiates Get Happy!! from other albums Costello made with the Attractions.

In lists ranking Costello's albums from worst to best, Get Happy!! has consistently ranked among his best. In 2021, writers for Stereogum placed it at number three, arguing that Costello composed a one-of-a-kind album in which "no pop songwriter has provided so efficient and complete an experience since the Beatles circa Hard Day's Night [1964]." They concluded, "Get Happy!! is all strong medicine and weapons-grade hooks." A year later, writing for Spin magazine, Al Shipley placed it at number six, referring to it as "an incredible burst of energy" in which "the Attractions' manic performances and some of Costello's most deranged wordplay give the album a frenetic charge even beyond their other early albums." The same year, Gallucci also placed it at number five in Ultimate Classic Rock, stating "there are better Costello albums but few as enjoyable".

Get Happy!! has made appearances on several lists of the best albums of the 1980s, including in 1989 by Rolling Stone at number 11, in 2002 by Pitchfork at number 26, and in 2012 by Slant Magazine at number 68. Additionally, Rolling Stone placed it at number 65 on its list of the best albums of the past 20 years in 1987. It was also placed at number 298 in the third edition of English writer Colin Larkin's All Time Top 1000 Albums (2000). Based on its appearances in professional rankings and listings, the aggregate website Acclaimed Music lists Get Happy!! as the 12th most acclaimed album of 1980, the 76th most acclaimed album of the 1980s and the 537th most acclaimed album in history.

Reissues
Get Happy!! was first released on CD through Columbia and Demon Records in January 1986. Its first extended reissue through Demon in the UK and Rykodisc in the US on CD came in April 1994. This reissue presented sides one and two in order of the record itself rather than the LP labels and came with a slew of bonus tracks. Rhino Records reissued the album in 2003 as a two-disc set; disc one contained the original 20-track album and disc two contained additional bonus tracks on top of the Rykodisc ones, one of which was a live version of "High Fidelity" that Costello states was his way of performing in the style of Bowie's 1976 album Station to Station. The album was remastered and reissued by UMe on 6 November 2015, who spread the content across two LPs.

Track listing
All songs written by Elvis Costello, except where noted.

Side one
 "Love for Tender" – 1:57
 "Opportunity" – 3:13
 "The Imposter" – 1:58
 "Secondary Modern" – 1:58
 "King Horse" – 3:01
 "Possession" – 2:03
 "Men Called Uncle" – 2:17
 "Clowntime Is Over" – 2:59
 "New Amsterdam" – 2:12
 "High Fidelity" – 2:28

Side two
 "I Can't Stand Up for Falling Down" (Homer Banks, Allen Jones) – 2:06
 "Black and White World" – 1:56
 "5ive Gears in Reverse" – 2:38
 "B Movie" – 2:04
 "Motel Matches" – 2:30
 "Human Touch" – 2:30
 "Beaten to the Punch" – 1:49
 "Temptation" – 2:33
 "I Stand Accused" (Tony Colton, Ray Smith) – 2:21
 "Riot Act" – 3:35

1994 Bonus Tracks
 "Girls Talk" – 1:54
 "Clowntime Is Over No.2" – 3:47
 "Getting Mighty Crowded" – 2:18
 "So Young" – 3:26
 "Just A Memory" – 2:19
 "Hoover Factory" – 1:47
 "Ghost Train" – 3:06
 "Dr. Luther's Assistant" – 3:30
 "Black & White World (Demo Version)" – 1:53
 "Riot Act (Demo Version)" – 2:50
 "Love For Tender (Demo Version)" – 1:39

Personnel
According to the 1994 reissue liner notes:
Elvis Costello – vocals, guitar, organ on "Possession", all instruments on "New Amsterdam"
Steve Nieve – piano, organ
Bruce Thomas – bass, harmonica on "I Stand Accused"
Pete Thomas – drums

Technical
Nick Lowe – producer
Roger Béchirian – engineer
Barney Bubbles as VAT 245 4945 42 – artwork
Keith Morris as VAT 239 7568 14 – photography

Charts

Weekly charts

Certifications

Notes

References

Sources

External links
 

1980 albums
Albums produced by Nick Lowe
Columbia Records albums
Elvis Costello albums
F-Beat Records albums
Hip-O Records albums
Rhino Records albums
Rykodisc albums
Universal Music Enterprises albums